The European Cricket Council (ECC) is an international body which oversaw cricket in European countries other than the Test-playing cricketing nation of England, the only European Full Member of the ICC for the duration of the ECC's existence.

History
Cricket is recorded as having first been played in Europe by Admiral Nelson's troops and sailors whilst they were stationed in Naples in 1793. The game quickly grew in popularity, and was regularly played at amateur level throughout the 19th century. Many professional clubs formed at the end of the 19th and beginning of the 20th century, the most famous of which, the Milan Cricket and Football Club, was the forerunner of A.C. Milan. However, the rise of Fascism across Europe in the 1920s and 1930s saw a decline in the game's popularity. Although it continued to be played at amateur level, it was not until the 1990s that it began to revive on a larger scale.

The ECC was founded in 1997, replacing the administration heavy European Cricket Federation, and expanded from an initial membership of 14 to having 34 member associations (as of 2022). Nine of the member nations had ICC associate status, a further 17 had affiliate status, and 11 were ICC prospective members. The game continues to grow in popularity, and three ECC members, Scotland, Ireland, and The Netherlands, along with test status England, competed in the 2007 ICC Cricket World Cup and the 2009 Twenty20 World Cup. Ireland became the 11th Test nation in the world & 2nd in Europe on 22 June 2017.

Activities

The ECC was the regional authority for Europe under the auspices of the worldwide governing authority of cricket,  the International Cricket Council (ICC). It was based in London, England, and hosted its executive meetings at Lord's. Its last chairman was Roger Knight.

The ECC was responsible for the promotion and development of the game of cricket across the European continent and Israel (for cricketing purposes, as with nearly all sports, Israel is considered to be a European country). Europe is a region where the game has not traditionally flourished. Cricket also faces tough competition from much more popular sports, such as football and basketball. It listsed its key objectives as: Participation, High Performance, Tournament Structure, Widening the Market, and promoting the Spirit of Cricket.

The ECC was responsible for organising the European Cricket Championship along with junior, indoor and women's tournaments. The tournament structure was part of the qualification for the Cricket ICC World Cup.

The ECC ran development programmes that support coaching, umpiring, training, clinics and sports medicine programmes in member countries. These programmes were the responsibility of the European Development Manager and a small team of staff, within the framework of the ICC Development Programmes's Key Objectives. Responsibility for hosting and supporting the ICC's five regional programmes falls to the Full Member in each region, in this case the England and Wales Cricket Board (ECB), who have, in turn, involved Marylebone Cricket Club (MCC) on the basis of MCC's existing strong links with Europe. The programme was financed largely by the ICC (through the biennial ICC Champions Trophy, at that time played between Full Members and Associate qualifiers) with assistance from the ECB and MCC, and a growing level of commercial sponsorship.

The ECC was brought under the auspices of the ICC Development programme as ICC Europe in 2008, and later dissolved as an independent body.

Members
ECC member associations were divided into two categories: full and associate members . Full members of the ICC are accorded "Full Member Status", whilst associate members of the ICC and ICC non-members are accorded "Associate Member Status".

Full members

Associate Members with ODI and T20I status

Associate Members with T20I status

Map

See also

 List of International Cricket Council members

References

External links
 International Cricket Council

Cricket administration
Cricket in Europe
International organisations based in London
Organisations based in the City of Westminster
Cri
Sport in the City of Westminster
Sports organizations established in 1997
1997 establishments in Europe